Fourteen nations would qualify for the Olympic tournament, eight to the preliminary round, and six to the first round.  The IIHF used the standings of the 1995 Men's World Ice Hockey Championships to determine qualification.  First, the top six nations from Pool A would go directly to the first round.  The preliminary round was made up of the nations ranked seventh and eighth, along with the host Japan, and five others from a series of qualification tournaments.  The nations ranked nine through twelve went straight to the final qualification round.

Regional Pre-Qualification 
Group A
Five nations played each other twice, both home and away, from October 25, 1995, until December 12, 1996.

Group B
This tournament was played in Tychy, Poland, from December 17 to 22, 1996.

Note: In January 1996 Greece beat Israel 10–2, but forfeited the result because of an ineligible player.  Following that, in March of the same year Israel played Yugoslavia, in Lithuania, losing 5–3.  Israel's loss is officially a 5–0 loss, the match was declared forfeit because they used ineligible players from Russia.

Group C
This tournament was played in Riga, Latvia, from August 27 to September 1, 1996.

Note: In January 1996 Hungary played a challenge series against Croatia winning 7–0 and 6–0.

Group D
The Asian Winter Games were used as a qualifying tournament, and were played in Harbin, China, from February 5 to 8, 1996.  Japan participated though already qualified for the Olympics.

Final Olympic Qualification 
The top two from each group qualify, the two third placed nations play for the final spot.
Group 1
Played in Oberhausen, Germany, from February 6 to 9, 1997.

Group 2
Played in Innsbruck, Austria, from February 6 to 9, 1997.

Play-off

'' secures the final spot in the preliminary round.

References

Sources
 Olympic Qualifiers 1995–98 
 Hokej SFRP – Olympic Games 1998 Qualifikation 
 avlh.sweb.cz – Kvalifikace Zimních olympijských her 1998  
 Hockeyarchives – Qualifications pour les Jeux Olympiques 1998 

Qual
Oly
Oly
Oly
Oly